Mothibistad is a town situated  northeast of Kuruman in the Northern Cape province of South Africa. Before 1994 it was in the Bophuthatswana bantustan, and from 1994 until a border change in 2006 it was in North West province. According to the census of 2011 it had a population of 9,616, of whom 99% described themselves as Black African and 88% spoke Tswana as a first language. It falls within the Ga-Segonyana Local Municipality and the John Taolo Gaetsewe District Municipality.

References

Populated places in the Ga-Segonyana Local Municipality